Vuk Rašović (Serbian Cyrillic: Вук Рашовић; born 3 January 1973) is a former Serbian footballer who is now the coach of Saudi Arabian club Al-Fayha.

Playing career
Rašović started to play for the youth teams of FK Partizan. He played professionally, initially, with FK Rad and Bulgarian Slavia Sofia. Then he returned to FK Partizan where he played from 1998 to 2002. In 2002, he moved to Krylia Sovetov of Russia, where he played between 2002 and 2003. In 2004, he signed with the American MLS team Kansas City Wizards but only played in one game for them during the 2004 season. He retired after the year as a result of suffering an injury.

Rašović played five times for the FR Yugoslavia national team, making his debut on 14 June 1997 against Egypt.

Managerial career
After retiring, Rašović started his coaching career with Partizan. He became the assistant manager of Goran Stevanović during the 2009–10 and Aleksandar Stanojević in 2010–11 season. Later on, he became a head coach of Partizan's affiliate, Teleoptik.

On 29 April 2013, Rašović was promoted as the new head coach of Partizan. He made his debut by defeating FK Radnički Niš on 2 May 2013.

From December 2014 to 1 May 2015, he was the director of football of Dinamo Minsk.

On 2018, Rašović signed for UAE side Al Dhafra, during his two-year spell, he would get them to qualify for two UAE President's Cup finals, he lost one and the second final was cancelled due to the COVID-19 pandemic in the United Arab Emirates. After two years at Al Dhafra, Rašović signed for Al Wahda. He was later dismissed in March 2021, due to poor results in both the league and cup competitions.

On 21 June 2021, Rašović was appointed as the manager of newly promoted Saudi Arabian side Al-Fayha.

Honours

Player
Partizan
FR Yugoslavia First League (3): 1993, 1999, 2002
FR Yugoslavia Cup (2): 1998, 2001

Manager
Partizan
Serbian SuperLiga (1): 2013

Al-Fayha
King Cup (1): 2021–22

Individual
 Saudi Professional League Manager of the Month: August 2021

References

External links

 Vuk Rašović at reprezentacija.rs

1973 births
Living people
Serbian footballers
Serbia and Montenegro international footballers
FK Partizan players
FK Rad players
PFC Krylia Sovetov Samara players
Russian Premier League players
Expatriate footballers in Russia
Sporting Kansas City players
Major League Soccer players
Expatriate soccer players in the United States
PFC Slavia Sofia players
First Professional Football League (Bulgaria) players
Serbia and Montenegro expatriate footballers
Serbia and Montenegro footballers
Expatriate footballers in Bulgaria
Association football defenders
Serbia and Montenegro expatriate sportspeople in Bulgaria
Serbia and Montenegro expatriate sportspeople in Russia
Serbia and Montenegro expatriate sportspeople in the United States
Serbian football managers
FK Partizan managers
FC Dinamo Minsk managers
Al-Faisaly FC managers
Al Dhafra FC managers
Al-Fayha FC managers
UAE Pro League managers
Serbian expatriate sportspeople in Saudi Arabia
Expatriate football managers in Saudi Arabia
Serbian expatriate sportspeople in the United Arab Emirates
Expatriate football managers in the United Arab Emirates
Saudi Professional League managers